NGC 24 is a spiral galaxy in the southern constellation of Sculptor, about  distant from the Milky Way. It was discovered by British astronomer William Herschel in 1785, and measures some 40,000 light-years across. The general shape of this galaxy is specified by its morphological classification of SA(s)c, which indicates it is an unbarred spiral with no ring-like structure and moderate to loosely-wound spiral arms. This galaxy is positioned in the vicinity of the Sculptor Group, but is actually a background object that is more than three times as distant. It may form a pair with another background galaxy, NGC 45.

References

External links
 
 

Unbarred spiral galaxies
0024
00701
UGCA objects
Sculptor (constellation)
Galaxies discovered in 1785
17851027
Discoveries by William Herschel